Paul Blackwell may refer to:
 Paul Blackwell (actor) (1954–2019), Australian actor
 Paul Blackwell (footballer) (born 1963), Welsh footballer
 Paul E. Blackwell (born 1941), United States Army general